Admiral Sir Henry Chads  (27 October 1819 – 29 June 1906) was a Royal Navy officer who went on to be Commander-in-Chief, The Nore.

Naval career
Born the son of Admiral Sir Henry Ducie Chads, Henry Chads joined the Royal Navy in 1832 and went on to take part in operations against Malay pirates in the Strait of Malacca.

Promoted to Captain in 1848, he commanded HMS Portland, HMS Amphion, HMS Conway, HMS Nile and then HMS London. He was appointed Captain-Superintendent of Deptford Dockyard in 1863 and Commander-in-Chief, The Nore in 1876 before retiring in 1884.

He lived at Portland House in Southsea and there is a memorial to him in St Judes Church in Portsmouth.

References

Further reading
 

1819 births
1906 deaths
Royal Navy admirals
Knights Commander of the Order of the Bath